The 2016 UniCredit Czech Open is a professional tennis tournament played on clay courts. It is the 23rd edition of the tournament which is part of the 2016 ATP Challenger Tour. It took place in Prostějov, Czech Republic between 31 May and 4 June 2016.

Singles main-draw entrants

Seeds

 1 Rankings are as of May 23, 2016.

Other entrants
The following players received wildcards into the singles main draw:
  Dominik Kellovský
  Zdeněk Kolář
  Alex Molčan
  Janko Tipsarević

The following players received entry as alternates into the singles main draw:
  Marco Cecchinato

The following players received special entry into the singles main draw:
  Guido Andreozzi

The following players received entry from the qualifying draw:
  Marcelo Demoliner
  Márton Fucsovics
  Juan Ignacio Londero
  João Souza

The following players received entry as lucky losers into the singles main draw:
  Miki Janković
  Dmitry Popko

Doubles main-draw entrants

Seeds

1 Rankings as of May 23, 2015.

Other entrants
The following pairs received wildcards into the doubles main draw:
  Dominik Kellovský /  Jaroslav Pospíšil
  Zdeněk Kolář /  Matěj Vocel
  Michal Konečný /  Václav Šafránek

Champions

Singles

  Mikhail Kukushkin def.  Márton Fucsovics, 6–1, 6–2

Doubles

  Aliaksandr Bury /  Igor Zelenay def.  Julio Peralta /  Hans Podlipnik, 6–4, 6–4

References

External links
 Official website

UniCredit Czech Open
Czech Open (tennis)
2016 in Czech tennis